Adam Helewka (born on July 21, 1995) is a Canadian professional ice hockey left winger. He is currently playing with HC TWK Innsbruck of the ICE Hockey League (ICEHL).

Early life
Helewka was born on July 21, 1995, in Burnaby, British Columbia, Canada, to parents Alison and Dave. His mother, a teacher, was born and raised in Wales while his father played rugby in Saskatchewan.

Playing career
Growing up in Burnaby, Helewka played with the Burnaby Winter Club of the Burnaby Minor Hockey League and Vancouver Northwest Giants, of the BC Hockey Major Midget League. After originally being cut from his tier-one team during his second year of bantams, and failing to join the Giants, he enrolled at the Athol Murray College of Notre Dame and played Double-A midget hockey. He played two seasons with Notre Dame before joining the Giants for one season in 2011–12.

Following his single season with the Giants, Helewka joined the Spokane Chiefs of the Western Hockey League (WHL) for their 2012–13 season. During his rookie season with the team, Helewka led Chief rookies wth 10 goals and 17 assists in 60 games to win the teams Rookie of the Year award. 

Although he was eligible for the 2013 and 2014 NHL Entry Drafts, Helewka went undrafted and remained eligible for the 2015 draft. During the 2014–15 season, Helewka increased his production output and recorded 44 goals and 43 assists for 87 points in 69 games. As a result, he was drafted 106th overall by the San Jose Sharks that summer. On December 16, 2015, Helewka was suspended for six games as a result of an after a post-horn fight with Parker Wotherspoon of the Tri City Americans. The six-game suspension was the longest in the WHL that season and carried a $1,000 fine for the team. Following the suspension, Helewka was traded to the Red Deer Rebels in exchange for Wyatt Johnson, Eli Zummack, a 2nd round selection in the 2016 Western Hockey League Bantam Draft and a 5th round pick in the 2017 WHL Bantam Draft. He concluded his major junior ice hockey career on March 3, 2016, by signing a three-year entry-level contract with the Sharks.

Professional
Upon completing his major junior career, Helewka joined the Sharks' American Hockey League (AHL) affiliate, the San Jose Barracuda, for the 2016–17 season. In his first full season with the team, Helewka scored 14 goals and 15 assists in 58 games. On June 15, 2018, the Sharks traded Helewka to the Arizona Coyotes in exchange for Kyle Wood. At the time of the trade, he had recorded 23 goals and 44 assists for 67 points through 121 career games. He immediately joined the Coyotes AHL affiliate, the Tucson Roadrunners, for 2018–19 before being traded to the Nashville Predators mid-way through the season. Despite the trade, Helewka continued setting new career highs in points with 38 and goals with 16 through 48 combined games with the Milwaukee Admirals and the Roadrunners. As a result, he was signed to a one-year contract to remain with the Predators organization on February 27, 2019.

Helewka's stint with the Predators organization was short-lived, however, as he was acquired by the New Jersey Devils on June 22, 2019, in exchange for future considerations. However, prior to the start of the 2019–20 season, Helewka left North America to join the Barys Nur-Sultan of the Kontinental Hockey League (KHL). He played eight games with the Nur-Sultan before joining the Linköping HC of the Swedish Hockey League. During the COVID-19 pandemic, Helewka was loaned to the HKM Zvolen of the Tipos extraliga.

On April 24, 2020, Helewka returned to North America and signed an AHL contract with the Cleveland Monsters, the Columbus Blue Jackets AHL affiliate.

Following two seasons with the Cleveland Monsters, Helewka left the AHL and returned abroad in agreeing to a one-year contract with Austrian club, HC Innsbruck of the ICEHL, on June 22, 2022.

Career statistics

Awards and honours

References

External links

1995 births
Living people
Allen Americans players
Barys Nur-Sultan players
Ice hockey people from British Columbia
Canadian ice hockey right wingers
Cleveland Monsters players
Linköping HC players
Milwaukee Admirals players
Red Deer Rebels players
San Jose Barracuda players
San Jose Sharks draft picks
Spokane Chiefs players
HC TWK Innsbruck players
Tucson Roadrunners players
HKM Zvolen players
Canadian people of Welsh descent
Canadian expatriate ice hockey players in the United States
Canadian expatriate ice hockey players in Slovakia
Canadian expatriate ice hockey players in Sweden
Canadian expatriate ice hockey players in Kazakhstan
Canadian expatriate ice hockey players in Austria